James Donald Raleigh (June 27, 1926 – August 21, 2012) was a Canadian professional ice hockey player who played centre with the New York Rangers of the National Hockey League between 1943 and 1956.

Playing career
Raleigh played most of his career in the National Hockey League for the New York Rangers, playing a total of 535 regular season games. He made his debut for the Rangers during the 1943-44 NHL season as a seventeen-year-old. Throughout his career he was known by the nickname 'Bones' because of his 150-pound frame. On February 25, 1948 against the Chicago Black Hawks he became the first player in Rangers history to score four goals in a single game. In the 1950 Stanley Cup Finals, Raleigh scored the overtime winner in games four and five against the Detroit Red Wings, making him the first player to score back-to-back overtime goals in the Stanley Cup Finals. The Red Wings would take game six and go on to win game seven in double overtime to win the Stanley Cup 4-3, in which Raleigh hit the crossbar in what would have been his third overtime goal in the finals and the cup-winning goal for the Rangers who wouldn't win another Stanley Cup until 1994. He retired from hockey in 1958.

Later life and death
Raleigh lived most of his life in Winnipeg, Manitoba and was inducted into the Manitoba Sports Hall of Fame and the Manitoba Hockey Hall of Fame. He suffered from failing health from 2010 and after suffering a fall he died on August 21, 2012 when his family made the decision to turn off his life support.

Awards and achievements 
MJHL Scoring Champion (1946)
Played in NHL All-Star Game (1951 and 1954)
Inducted into the Manitoba Sports Hall of Fame and Museum in 1998
Honoured Member of the Manitoba Hockey Hall of Fame
 In the 2009 book 100 Ranger Greats, was ranked No. 32 all-time of the 901 New York Rangers who had played during the team's first 82 seasons

Career statistics

Regular season and playoffs

Coaching record

References

External links

1926 births
2012 deaths
Canadian expatriate ice hockey players in the United States
Canadian ice hockey centres
Ice hockey people from Ontario
Manitoba Bisons ice hockey players
New York Rangers players
New York Rovers players
Sportspeople from Kenora
Ice hockey people from Winnipeg
Winnipeg Monarchs players